Arlissa Ruppert (born 21 September 1992), known professionally as Arlissa, is a German-born British singer and songwriter. She has released three singles, collaborated with Nas and was listed on the BBC's Sound of 2013.

Life and career

Arlissa Ruppert was born in Germany, and raised in London, UK. Her mother, who served in the U.S Army in Germany, is American and her father is German.

Her debut track "Hard to Love Somebody" got the attention of a publisher, who eventually passed it on to rapper Nas. After hearing the track, Nas approached Arlissa to feature on it. "Hard to Love Somebody" was chosen as Scott Mills' record of the week on BBC Radio 1 in November 2012. Arlissa was named as one of the BBC’s one to watch for 2013, when she made the longlist for the Sound of 2013.

Her first official single "Sticks & Stones" was released on 3 March 2013, and was described as a 'stomping break-up anthem'. The song peaked at number 48 in the UK Singles Chart. In 2017, Nelly Furtado covered "Sticks and Stones" for her sixth studio album The Ride.

Arlissa co-wrote K-pop group BTS's "Spring Day". The single was a success, topping the Gaon Digital Chart, and has since surpassed 2,500,000+ downloads. The song also won 'Song of the Year' at the 2017 Melon Music Awards.

In January 2018, she collaborated with British DJ/producer Jonas Blue on an EDM version of her song "Hearts Ain't Gonna Lie". She was picked in March 2018 as Elvis Duran's Artist of the Month, and was featured on NBC's Today show hosted by Hoda Kotb and Kathie Lee Gifford, broadcast nationally in the United States on 21 March 2018 where Arlissa performed a live acoustic version of her single.

Arlissa co-wrote and performed the track "We Won't Move" for the 2018 film The Hate U Give, based upon The New York Times, a best-selling novel by Angie Thomas. She performed the track at the film's international premiere at the 2018 Toronto Film Festival.

On 17 June 2022, Arlissa revealed the title of her debut album, The Open-Hearted, and released the lead single, "Take".

Discography

Studio albums

Extended plays

Singles

As lead artist

As featured artist

Other appearances

Writer/co-writer for other artists

References

External links
 

1992 births
Living people
British songwriters
British pop singers
LGBT Black British people
English LGBT singers
English LGBT songwriters
Queer songwriters
21st-century Black British women singers
21st-century LGBT people
Pansexual musicians
Pansexual women
Queer women
English people of African-American descent
English people of German descent